Geography of Georgia may refer to:
Geography of Georgia (country)
Geography of Georgia (U.S. state)